Sigurður Einarsson may refer to:

 Sigurður Einarsson (athlete) (born 1962), former Icelandic javelin thrower
 Sigurður Einarsson (economist) (born 1960), former CEO and then chairman of failed Icelandic Kaupthing Bank
 Sigurður Einarsson (handballer) (born 1943), Icelandic former handball player
 Sigurður Einarsson (footballer) (born 1943), Icelandic former football player